Space Farms Zoo and Museum is a roadside zoo and historical museum located at 218 Route 519, in the Beemerville section of Wantage Township in Sussex County, New Jersey, in the United States. It is currently owned by New Jersey Assemblyman Parker Space.

Founded in 1927, the zoo is home to a wide selection of mammals and reptiles, including some endangered species. At one time, Space Farms was host to the largest bear in captivity in the world, a Kodiak bear named Goliath, part of a taxidermy exhibit in the main hall of the museum as of his death in 1991. His large skull is upstairs, where it can be compared to skulls of other animals.

The Space Farms museum houses antique vehicles and items used during the early history of the United States, such as horse-drawn carriages and early motorcycles. The vehicles are largely unrestored. There are also colonial period tools and weapons on display.

Notes

Further reading 
 Day, Lori S. The Zookeeper's Daughter PublishAmerica, 2004.
 Day, Lori S. Zoo Momma Daylite Sales, 2016
 Space, Fred. Ralph Space the Legend, The Story of Space Farms and Tales of Beemerville Privately Published, 2007.

External links 

The Space Farms Museum Collection of Southwest Virginia Artifacts by Jim Glanville

1927 establishments in New Jersey
Zoos in New Jersey
Natural history museums in New Jersey
Transportation museums in New Jersey
Museums in Sussex County, New Jersey
Wantage Township, New Jersey